Sulaymān I, (full name Sulaymān Ibn 'Abd Allāh al-Kāmil), sometimes called Sidi Sliman or Moulay Slimane, was the brother of Idris I of Morocco, son of the great grandson of the caliph Ali and Fatima, daughter of the Islamic prophet Muhammad. He was probably born around 730 and died in 814, perhaps in Ain El Hout in the province of Tlemcen in Algeria.

According to Ibn Khaldoun, he reached Tlemcen after the assassination of his brother Idris I in 791 and took control of it. But according to Ibn Idhari and Al-Bakri, he would have settled in Tlemcen while his brother was alive and probably with his approval. This is the version retained by historians Philippe Sénac and Patrice Cressier who indicate that Sulaymān I was governor of Tlemcen between 786 and 813. However, according to other ancient Arab authors, he would not have escaped the massacre of Fakh and would have died in June 786.

He gives his name to the Sulaymanid dynasty in Algeria, being the father of Muḥammad who already governed the region in 806.

References 

 
8th-century monarchs in Africa
9th-century monarchs in Africa
Sultans
730 births
814 deaths
9th-century Arabs